The Department of Extranormal Operations (DEO) is a government agency in the DC Universe appearing in American comic books published by DC Comics. It was co-created by Dan Curtis Johnson and J. H. Williams III and first appeared in Batman #550 (1998). The agency was the focus of the Chase series. It is featured in the Supergirl television series. The agency has a complicated relationship with the depiction of law and constitutional rights in the DC Universe.

Fictional organization history
The role of the DEO is to monitor those with extranormal superpowers and to prevent any threat to the general public. However, in Action Comics #775 there are a couple of rogue agents defeated by Superman. Manchester Black, the leader of The Elite, suggests they are responsible for the creation of fellow team member Menagerie, saying that "These guys run a triple black alien immigration service that takes the galaxies' cast-offs an' turns them into weapons for the highest bidder. The West Nile glop in New York is one of theirs from the Microbio Division."

The DEO was responsible for the "orphanage" seen in Young Justice in which Secret was kept, although a later conversation between Director Bones and Agent Chase suggested the conditions in which she was kept were not official policy. Another such orphanage was seen in the 1999 Titans series.

The DEO has protected important aspects of Washington, D.C., from telepathic intrusion.

A rogue department of the DEO manages to convince Green Lantern to scan various heroes, presumably to detect a body-hopping supervillain. Instead, the data is used to create a new version of Amazo. Chase, Mr. Bones, Green Lantern and other heroes shut down the division. Amazo is destroyed and Green Lantern deletes the relevant information.

Batwoman becomes a reluctant agent of the DEO after the agency learns her identity. Mister Bones, director of the DEO, believes himself to be the illegitimate son of Col. Jacob Kane, Batwoman's father. DEO agents discover that Beth Kane, Batwoman's identical twin sister, is alive and capture her. Bones blackmails Batwoman into helping the DEO uncover the secret identity of Batman in exchange for Beth. Batwoman and her allies are unable to rescue Beth and Bones attempts to kill her. Agent Asaf, suborned by Batwoman, shoots Bones in the head and frees Beth. Asaf then claims that Bones was mentally unbalanced (Bones is brain-damaged but survives)

Operatives

Executive directors
 Mister Bones - Pre-Crisis/Post-Crisis
 Dr. Amanda Waller - New 52
 Cameron Chase - DC Rebirth
 Alex Danvers - Supergirl (TV series, 2015-2022)
 J'onn J'onzz - Supergirl (TV series, 2015-2022)

Agents
 Agent Sandra "The Bear" Barrett
 Agent Kate Spencer
 Alesandra Taracon (undercover as Cucilla in Slabside Penitentiary).
 Donald Fite and Ishido Madd (occasional allies of Young Justice, seconded from A.P.E.S.).
 Sarge Steel (director of the Department of Metahuman Affairs, a subdivision of the DEO).
 Agent Liberty
 Batwoman
 Emilia Harcourt (formerly) - Peacemaker (TV series, 2022)

Other intelligence agencies

Other versions

Smallville
 In the comics continuation of Smallville, the DEO appears as a Washington, D.C.-based agency under Director Bones (and later Steve Trevor) dealing with threats like Felix Faust and Dr. Phosphorus. Under Trevor, the DEO took steps in employing individuals like Cameron Chase, and even heroes like Oliver Queen/Green Arrow and Diana Prince, to their causes.

In other media

Film
In the 2011 film Green Lantern, the DEO appears as an agency under the secret support of Sen. Robert Hammond. His son, Dr. Hector Hammond, is given the assignment of doing the autopsy of Abin Sur by one of the main heads, Dr. Amanda Waller.

Television
It was revealed in the Peacemaker episode "Better Goff Dead" that Emilia Harcourt was a DEO agent before joining A.R.G.U.S. as an agent.

Arrowverse
The DEO appears in the TV series set in the Arrowverse.

 In the 2015 CBS/CW television series Supergirl, the Department of Extranormal Operations employs Kara Zor-El's adoptive sister Alex Danvers as a scientist and operative. This iteration of the agency is led by former CIA agent Hank Henshaw (later revealed to be J'onn J'onzz in disguise after the real Hank Henshaw was presumably killed while on assignment). Thanks to J'onn, the DEO now is less prejudiced against non-humans and focused on battling rogue extraterrestrials in addition to occasional criminal, metahuman and terrorist threats. It is learned in season two that Superman was a member of the team. Through Supergirl's alignment with superheroes from a parallel Earth (Earth-1), the DEO is aligned with S.T.A.R. Labs and accessing their technology for dealing with their own metahuman and parallel universal threats. In season four, Alex has been named as the new director of the DEO from J'onn. In season five, the DEO headquarters is leveled during the fight with Rama Khan.
 At the end of the four-part Arrowverse crossover, "Invasion!", Kara speaks with the Earth-1 universe's succeeding U.S. president, Susan Brayden; she informs the new chief executive that the United States government of her universe (Earth-38) founded the DEO for monitoring and countering extraterrestrial threats, and the president agrees that her administration would establish their own agency in response to the Dominators' attacks.``
 During the final part of the later Arrowverse crossover "Crisis on Infinite Earths", following the multiverse being rebooted, Supergirl's universe was merged with others including Earth-1's to create Earth-Prime and the DEO was altered to become a subsidiary of LuthorCorp.
 The DEO is featured in the Legends of Tomorrow episode "Ground Control to Sara Lance". When Ava Sharpe tries to contact the DEO to help find the aliens that took Sara Lance, all that is shown is the DEO headquarters still in ruins. Gideon brings this historical moment up with Ava causing them to go to plan B and enlist Esperanza "Spooner" Cruz per the suggestion of Behrad Tarazi.

Video games
The DEO had a brief appearance in the intro level to Batman: Arkham Origins Blackgate, where they acted as adversaries to both Batman and Catwoman, the former due to mistaken association with the latter, and the latter due to stealing classified data.

References

External links
 

Fictional detective agencies
Fictional government investigations of the paranormal
Fictional intelligence agencies
Fictional military organizations
Fictional elements introduced in 1998
DC Comics law enforcement agencies